Howard John Lloyd (born March 16, 1930) is a Canadian former politician. He served in the Legislative Assembly of British Columbia from 1976 to 1979, as a Social Credit member for the constituency of Fort George.

References

British Columbia Social Credit Party MLAs
1930 births
Living people
People from Turtleford